The following is a list of Constituencies of Pakistan for elected seats in the National Assembly, which is the lower house of the Parliament of Pakistan, and Provincial/Legislative Assemblies of Pakistan (Punjab, Sindh, Balochistan, Khyber Pakhtunkhwa, Gilgit-Baltistan, Azad Jammu and Kashmir)

List of National Assembly constituencies
The name of a constituency of the National Assembly is as follows: NA (National Assembly) followed by a consecutive number. A member of the National Assembly is called an MNA. The following is a list of the seats allocated by province in the Constitution of Pakistan for the National Assembly.

This Table shows constituencies after the 31st Amendment to Constitution of Pakistan.

List of Provincial Assemblies constituencies

Punjab 

The name of a constituency of the Provincial Assembly of the Punjab is as follows: PP (Province of Punjab) followed by a number. A member of the Provincial Assembly is called an MPA. The following table shows the distribution of seats of the Assembly among the districts of Punjab. 297 general seats are directly elected through the first-past-the-post system, where as 66 seats reserved for women and 8 seats reserved for non-Muslims are indirectly elected through proportional representation based on the proportion of general seats won by each party.

Sindh 

The name of a constituency of Provincial Assembly of Sindh is called PS (Province of Sindh) followed by a number. A member of the Provincial Assembly is called an MPA. There are 168 seats in the Assembly, with 130 being general seats, 29 being reserved seats for women, and 9 being reserved seats for non-Muslims.

Balochistan 

The name of a constituency of Provincial Assembly of Balochistan is as follows: PB (Province of Balochistan) followed by a number. A member of the Provincial Assembly is called an MPA. There are 65 seats in this assembly, with 51 being general seats, 11 being reserved seats for women, and 3 being reserved seats for non-Muslims.

Khyber Pakhtunkhwa 

The name of a constituency of the Provincial Assembly of Khyber Pakhtunkhwa is as follows: PK (Province of Khyber-Pakhtunkhwa) followed by a number. A member of the Provincial Assembly is called an MPA. There are 145 seats in the Assembly, with 115 being general seats, 26 being reserved seats for women, and 4 being reserved seats for non-Muslims.

Gilgit Baltistan 

The constituency of Gilgit Baltistan Assembly is called GBA (Gilgit Baltistan Assembly). A total of 33 seats are in the assembly.

Constituencies of Gilgit Baltistan.

Below Table shows constituencies of Gilgit Baltistan.

Azad Jammu and Kashmir 

 

The constituency of Azad Kashmir Assembly is called LA (Legislative Assembly). 

Tables show list of Constituencies of Provincial assemblies of Pakistan.

Constituencies of Azad Kashmir.

Below Table shows Constituencies of Azad Kashmir.

National Assembly and Provincial Assembly Seat segments list 
Constituency name of National Assembly along with the name of Provincial Assemblies in the same area with the area name.

See also 
 Member of the Provincial Assembly
 List of provincial governments of Pakistan

References 

List of Pakistan National Assembly Seats

Constitution of Pakistan in PDF

 
Elections in Pakistan
National Assembly of Pakistan
Provincial Assemblies of Pakistan
Parliament of Pakistan